Mikhail Krutikov (born 30 December 1967) is a Russian sailor. He competed at the 2000 Summer Olympics and the 2004 Summer Olympics.

References

External links
 

1967 births
Living people
Russian male sailors (sport)
Olympic sailors of Russia
Sailors at the 2000 Summer Olympics – 470
Sailors at the 2004 Summer Olympics – 470
Sportspeople from Lipetsk